The 61st National Film Awards ceremony was an event during which the Directorate of Film Festivals of India presented its annual National Film Awards to honour the best films of 2013 in the Indian cinema. The ceremony was held on 3 May 2014.

Selection process 

The Directorate of Film Festivals invited nominations for the awards on 24 January 2014. The acceptable last date for entries was until 14 February 2014. Feature and Non-Feature Films certified by Central Board of Film Certification between 1 January 2013, and 31 December 2013, were eligible for the film award categories. Books, critical studies, reviews or articles on cinema published in Indian newspapers, magazines, and journals between 1 January 2013, and 31 December 2013, were eligible for the best writing on cinema section. Entries of dubbed, revised or copied versions of a film or translation, abridgements, edited or annotated works and reprints were ineligible for the awards.

For the Feature and Non-Feature Films sections, films in any Indian language, shot on 16 mm, 35 mm, a wider film gauge or a digital format, and released in cinemas, on video or digital formats for home viewing were eligible. Films were required to be certified as a feature film, a featurette or a Documentary/Newsreel/Non-Fiction by the Central Board of Film Certification.

Dadasaheb Phalke Award 

Introduced in 1969, the Dadasaheb Phalke Award is the highest award given to recognise the contributions of film personalities towards the development of Indian cinema and for distinguished contributions to the medium, its growth and promotion. A committee consisting of seven personalities from the Indian film industry was appointed to evaluate the Dadasaheb Phalke award nominations for 2013. Following were the jury members:

 Jury Members

For the year 2013, the award was announced on 12 April 2014 to be presented to Gulzar, a veteran poet, lyric writer and film director. He has won five National Film Awards, 20 Filmfare Awards, one Academy Award, one Grammy Award and is also Padma Bhushan recipient of 2004.

Feature films 
A Bengali film, Jaatishwar won the maximum number of awards (4) followed by Telugu film Na Bangaaru Talli, Tamil film Thanga Meenkal and Marathi film Yellow (3 awards each)

Jury 
For the Feature Film section, six committees were formed based on the different geographic regions in India. The two-tier evaluation process included a central committee and five regional committees. The central committee, headed by Saeed Akhtar Mirza, included the heads of each regional committee and five other jury members. At regional level, each committee consisted of one chief and four members. The chief and one non-chief member of each regional committee were selected from outside that geographic region. The table below names the jury members for the central and regional committees:

Central Jury

Northern Region: 

Eastern Region: 

Western Region: 

Southern Region I: 

Southern Region II:

All India Awards

Golden Lotus Award 
All the winners are awarded with a Swarna Kamal (Golden Lotus Award), a certificate and a cash prize.

Silver Lotus Award 

All the winners were awarded with a Rajat Kamal (Silver Lotus Award), a certificate and a cash prize.

Regional Award 

National Film Awards are also given to the best films in the regional languages of India. Awards for the regional languages are categorised as per their mention in the Eighth schedule of the Constitution of India. Awardees included producers and directors of the film. No films in languages other than those specified in the Schedule VIII of the Constitution were eligible.

Best Feature Film in Each of the Language Other Than Those Specified In the Schedule VIII of the Constitution

Non-Feature Films

Jury 
A committee of seven, headed by chair, Ashoke Viswanathan was appointed to evaluate the Non-Feature Films entries. The jury members were:

Golden Lotus Award 
All the winners were awarded with Swarna Kamal (Golden Lotus Award), a certificate and cash prize.

Silver Lotus Award 

All the winners were awarded with Rajat Kamal (Silver Lotus Award) and cash prize.

Best Writing on Cinema

Jury 
A committee of three, headed by Sharad Dutt was appointed to evaluate the nominations for the best writing on Indian cinema. The jury members were as follows:

The Best Writing on Cinema awards are intended to encourage the study and appreciation of cinema as an art form and the dissemination of information and critical appreciation of the medium through books, articles, reviews etc.

Golden Lotus Award 

All the winners were awarded with Swarna Kamal (Golden Lotus Award), cash prize and a certificate.

Awards not presented 

Feature films
 Best Animated Film
 Best Film on Family Welfare
 Best Feature Film in Oriya

 Non-feature films
 Best Animation Film
 Best Anthropological / Ethnographic Film
 Best Exploration / Adventure Film (Including sports)

References

External links 

Official websites

 61st National Film Awards: Official Catalogue
 National Film Awards Archives
 Official Page for Directorate of Film Festivals, India
 61st National Film Awards: Regulations for submission

Other resources
Ministry of Information & Broadcasting (Press release)

National Film Awards (India) ceremonies
2014 Indian film awards